Trifolium ornithopodioides, the bird's foot clover, is a species of flowering plant in the family Fabaceae. It is native to Europe, Madeira, and northwestern Africa, and has been introduced to Australia and New Zealand. It is a halophyte.

References

ornithopodioides
Halophytes
Flora of Ireland
Flora of Great Britain
Flora of the Netherlands
Flora of Germany
Flora of Hungary
Flora of Southwestern Europe
Flora of Italy
Flora of Romania
Flora of Crete
Flora of the East Aegean Islands
Flora of Madeira
Flora of Morocco
Flora of Algeria
Plants described in 1753
Taxa named by Carl Linnaeus